The 2009 North African Cup Winners Cup was the second edition of the competition initiated in 2008 by the UNAF. CS Sfaxien of Tunisia were crowned champions after defeating Ahly Benghazi of Libya in the final on the away goals rule.

Participating teams
 Chabab Riadhi de Belouizdad (2008-09 Algerian Cup winners)
 Ahly Benghazi (Invited)
 Forces Armées Royales Rabat (2008-09 Coupe du Trône winners)
 Club Sportif Sfaxien (2008-09 Tunisian President Cup winners)

Draw
The draw was made in Djerba, Tunisia on 25 July 2009 at a FNAF meeting.

Semi-finals

First Legs

Second Legs

CS Sfaxien win 5–1 on aggregate.

Ahly Benghazi win 1–0 on aggregate.

Final

First leg

Second leg

Ahly Benghazi 1–1 CS Sfaxien on aggregate. CS Sfaxien win on the away goals rule

References

External links
 goalzz.com

2009
2009 in African football
2009–10 in Moroccan football
2009–10 in Algerian football
2009–10 in Libyan football
2009–10 in Tunisian football